Qaleh-ye Seddiq (also Romanized as Qal‘eh-ye Şeddīq; also known as Shahrak-e Novīn) is a village in Howmeh Rural District, in the Central District of Shahrud County, Semnan Province, Iran. At the 2006 census, its population was 293, in 74 families.

References 

Populated places in Shahrud County